Saqandin Kola (also Romanized as Saqandīn Kolā; also known as Saqandī Kolā, Soqondī Kalā, Soqondī Kolā, and Sugundun) is a village in Kolijan Rostaq-e Olya Rural District, Kolijan Rostaq District, Sari County, Mazandaran Province, Iran. At the 2006 census, its population was 271, in 95 families.

References 

Populated places in Sari County